Telecommunications systems management (Telecomm or TSM for short, also Telecommunication systems, Telecommunications management, Network management) is an interdisciplinary area of study offered at some universities to fill the need for a liaison between the technical aspect and the business aspect of telecommunications. At Murray State University it has been regarded as a half-and-half program, half business and half networking classes with the option to specialize in certain aspects in the field.

Colleges and Universities Offering TSM
California State University, East Bay
Capitol College
DePaul University
Istanbul Technical University
Midlands Technical College
Murray State University
University of Athens
New Jersey Institute of Technology
New York Institute Of Technology
Northeastern
Ohio University
Oklahoma State University (College of Engineering, Architecture, and Technology)
Stevens Institute of Technology
Syracuse University
Trident Technical College
University of Maryland University College
University of Pennsylvania
Indian Institute of Technology Delhi - Department of Management Studies (DMS-IIT Delhi)

Network management
Telecommunications systems